Filippo Volandri (born 5 September 1981) is a former Italian professional male tennis player. Volandri is a right-handed player who reached a career-high singles ranking of world no. 25 in July 2007. He turned professional in 1997 and has earned almost $4,000,000 in prize money.

Earlier career

2006: Second title
Volandri won the second title of his career in September 2006, beating Nicolás Lapentti in the final of the Sicily International in Palermo.

2007: Rome Masters & French open success
At the Rome Masters in 2007 Volandri, having entered as a wild card, recorded the biggest win of his career by beating the then world no. 1 Roger Federer in straight sets 6–2, 6–4. Volandri celebrated by doing a lap of honour around centre court, high-fiving spectators in the front rows.
Afterwards, Volandri hailed the victory as not only for himself, but for Italy, speaking of both the regard in which Federer, who holds the record for the longest spell as the world's top-ranked male player, is held, and the relative under-achievement of Italy in men's tennis at the time. For his part Federer offered few excuses for his out-of-character display.
Hopes that this might be the start of Italy's re-emergence among the top nations of professional men's tennis were heightened when Volandri went on to beat world no. 12 Tomáš Berdych in the quarterfinal. The win meant that Volandri became the first Italian to reach the event's semifinals since 1978. His run stopped in the semifinals, however, as he lost to Fernando González. 

At the 2007 French Open he was the 29th seed and made it to the fourth round, rising to No. 27 in the world in the rankings, before losing in straight sets to Tommy Robredo.

Later career

Volandri struggled greatly after the dropped match-fixing allegations, his only major success since 2007 was making it to the final of the 2012 Brasil Open after he beat then world No. 38 Thomaz Bellucci in the semifinal. He lost to then world No. 11 and top seed Nicolás Almagro in 3 sets. However, since then he mainly competed on the ATP Challenger Tour, whilst since he reached the fourth round in the 2007 French Open he did not progress past the first round of a Grand Slam.

On 23 June 2015, Volandri completed 300 wins at the ATP Challenger Tour tournaments by defeating Oriol Roca Batalla at the Aspria Tennis Cup in Milan. He became only the fourth player ever who obtained this achievement.

Controversy
Volandri had earlier come under suspicion for betting and match fixing, and his name featured prominently in a list compiled by the ATP of matches under suspicion for corruption.

In January 2009, Volandri received a three-month ban from the ATP for a doping offence after testing positive for salbutamol during the Indian Wells tournament. Volandri had a medical exemption from the International Tennis Federation to use salbutamol, an asthma medication, but the ITF deemed that his use of the drug was beyond therapeutic needs. His suspension was to last until 14 April 2009 and required him to forfeit all prize money and ranking points earned from the date of the failed test until the beginning of his suspension.

In March 2009, the Court of Arbitration for Sport overruled the ATP decision and ruled that Volandri should be reinstated and his forfeited ranking points and earnings returned to him. Volandri stated that he intended to sue the ATP over the incident.

ATP career finals

Singles: 9 (2 titles, 7 runner-ups)

Doubles: 1 (1 runner-up)

ATP Challengers

Performance timelines

Singles 

1 Was played on hardcourt from 2002–2008.
2 Held as Hamburg Masters until 2008 and Shanghai Masters from 2009.

Doubles
''Current as far as the 2012 US Open (tennis).

Top 10 wins 
 Volandri has an 8–23 (.258) record against players who were, at the time the match was played, ranked in the top 10.

References

External links 

 
 
 
 Official website 
 Volandri world ranking history

1981 births
Living people
Doping cases in tennis
Italian male tennis players
Olympic tennis players of Italy
Tennis players at the 2004 Summer Olympics
Italian sportspeople in doping cases